

Generalleutnant Ernst Maisel (16 September 1896 – 16 December 1978) was a general in the Wehrmacht of Nazi Germany during World War II.

As a Generalmajor he was Chief of the Office Group for Officers' Education and Welfare of the Army Personnel Office. One of his responsibilities in this appointment was to be court protocol officer of the Army court of honour that investigated army officers suspected of involvement in the 20 July plot. In this capacity on 14 October 1944 he arrived with General Wilhelm Burgdorf at the home of Field Marshal Erwin Rommel.  Burgdorf had been instructed by Field Marshal Wilhelm Keitel to offer Rommel three choices: report to Hitler to exculpate himself; admit guilt, take poison, receive a state funeral, and obtain immunity for his family; or face a treason trial. Rommel drove away with Burgdorf and Maisel and committed suicide shortly thereafter.

In the last days of the war, Maisel was appointed commander the 68th Infantry Division with the rank of Generalleutnant. He was taken into captivity by the Americans on 7 May 1945, was released in March 1947 and died aged 82 in 1978.

Awards

 Knight's Cross of the Iron Cross on 6 April 1942 as Oberst and commander of the Infanterie-Regiment 42

References

Citations

Bibliography

 

1896 births
1978 deaths
People from Landau
Lieutenant generals of the German Army (Wehrmacht)
German Army personnel of World War I
Recipients of the clasp to the Iron Cross, 1st class
Recipients of the Knight's Cross of the Iron Cross
German prisoners of war in World War II held by the United States
People from the Palatinate (region)
People from the Kingdom of Bavaria
Military personnel from Rhineland-Palatinate
German Army personnel of World War II